The Red Head Rapids Formation is a geologic formation in Manitoba. It preserves fossils dating back to the Ordovician period.

See also

 List of fossiliferous stratigraphic units in Manitoba

References
 

Ordovician Manitoba
Ordovician southern paleotropical deposits